The Bergger company was begun over a century ago by French manufacturer Guilleminot. The company manufactures monochrome photographic film 35mm to 20"x24" as well as photographic paper and chemicals.

As of 2021, Bergger currently offer a single B&W film manufactured on their behalf, Pancro 400 introduced in 2015 replacing BRF400Plus (in 120, 35 mm and sheet formats), and a low sensitivity (ISO 3) print film for darkroom use (in sheet format).

See also
 List of photographic films
 List of discontinued photographic films

References

External links
 

Photography companies of France
Photographic film makers
French brands